Johannes Coenrad "Boeta" Wessels  (born 30 June 1973) is a South African former rugby union player.

Playing career
Wessels matriculated at Kathu High School in the Northern Cape and was selected for the  Craven Week team in 1991. He made his senior provincial debut for the Griquas in 1993 and played in 111 first-class matches for the union.

Wessels toured with the Springboks to Europe in 1997. He did not play in any test matches for the Springboks and played in one tour match.

See also
List of South Africa national rugby union players – Springbok no. 664

References

1973 births
Living people
South African rugby union players
South Africa international rugby union players
Griquas (rugby union) players
Blue Bulls players
Leopards (rugby union) players
Sharks (rugby union) players
Lions (United Rugby Championship) players
Bulls (rugby union) players
Rugby union fly-halves
Rugby union fullbacks
Rugby union players from the Northern Cape